Sinatra/Basie: The Complete Reprise Studio Recordings is a 2011 compilation album by American singer Frank Sinatra that consists of 20 songs he recorded with jazz pianist Count Basie. 10 tracks from "Sinatra–Basie: An Historic Musical First" (1962), and 10 more from "It Might as Well Be Swing" (1964).

Track listing
"Pennies from Heaven" (Arthur Johnston, Johnny Burke) – 3:29
"Please Be Kind" (Saul Chaplin, Sammy Cahn) – 2:43
"(Love Is) The Tender Trap" (Cahn, Jimmy Van Heusen) – 2:37
"Looking at the World Through Rose Colored Glasses" (Jimmy Steiger, Tommy Malie) – 2:32
"My Kind of Girl" (Leslie Bricusse) – 4:37
"I Only Have Eyes for You" (Harry Warren, Al Dubin) – 3:31
"Nice Work If You Can Get It" (George Gershwin, Ira Gershwin) – 2:37
"Learnin' the Blues" (Dolores Vicki Silvers) – 4:25
"I'm Gonna Sit Right Down and Write Myself a Letter" (Fred Ahlert, Joe Young) – 2:36
"I Won't Dance" (Jerome Kern, Jimmy McHugh, Oscar Hammerstein II, Dorothy Fields, Otto Harbach) – 4:07
"Fly Me to the Moon (In Other Words)" (Bart Howard) – 2:30
"I Wish You Love" (Léo Chauliac, Charles Trenet, Albert Beach) – 2:56
"I Believe in You" (Frank Loesser) – 2:21
"More (Theme from Mondo Cane)" (Riz Ortolani, Nino Oliviero, Marcello Ciorciolini, Norman Newell) – 3:05
"I Can't Stop Loving You" (Don Gibson) – 3:00
"Hello, Dolly!" (Jerry Herman) – 2:45
"I Wanna Be Around" (Johnny Mercer, Sadie Vimmerstedt) – 2:25
"The Best Is Yet to Come" (Cy Coleman, Carolyn Leigh) – 3:10
"The Good Life" (Sacha Distel, Jack Reardon) – 3:10
"Wives and Lovers" (Burt Bacharach, Hal David) – 2:50

2010 compilation albums
Frank Sinatra compilation albums